The 1984 Congoleum Classic was a men's tennis tournament played on outdoor hard courts. It was the 11th edition of the tournament and was part of the Super Series of the 1984 Volvo Grand Prix circuit. It was played at the La Quinta Resort and Club in La Quinta, California in the United States and took place from February 13 through February 19, 1984. First-seeded Jimmy Connors won the singles title.

Finals

Singles

 Jimmy Connors defeated  Yannick Noah 6–2, 6–7, 6–3
 It was Connors' 2nd singles title of the year and the 102nd of his career.

Doubles

 Bernard Mitton /  Butch Walts defeated  Scott Davis /  Ferdi Taygan 5–7, 6–3, 6–2
 It was Mitton's only title of the year and the 11th of his career. It was Walts' 1st title of the year and the 18th of his career.

References

External links
 
 Association of Tennis Professionals (ATP) tournament profile

 
1984 Congoleum Classic
Congoleum Classic
Congoleum Classic
Congoleum Classic
Congoleum Classic